Born Dead is the second studio album by American heavy metal band Body Count. The album was released on September 6, 1994.

Lyrical subject matter includes war ("Shallow Graves"), drugs ("Street Lobotomy"), death ("Surviving the Game"), murder ("Last Breath") and the mosh pit ("Killin' Floor").

Among other tracks, the album features a cover of Billy Roberts' "Hey Joe," performed in the style of Jimi Hendrix' recording of the song, as originally featured on the Are You Experienced album. Body Count's cover of the song was first featured on the Hendrix tribute album Stone Free: A Tribute to Jimi Hendrix.

In the liner notes, Ice-T dedicates the album "to all the people of color throughout the entire world: Asian, Latino, Native American, Hawaiian, Italian, Indian, Persian, African, Aboriginal and any other nationality that white supremacists would love to see born dead."  Born Dead peaked at #74 on the Billboard 200.

Track listing

Personnel
Ice-T – lead vocals
Ernie C – lead guitar, acoustic guitar
D-Roc the Executioner – rhythm guitar
Mooseman – bass guitar
Beatmaster V – drums
Sean E Sean – sampler, backing vocals
Sean E. Mac – hype man, backing vocals

Charts

Weekly charts

Year-end charts

References

1994 albums
Body Count (band) albums
Rap metal
Virgin Records albums